Phùng Thị Chính was a Vietnamese noblewoman who fought alongside the Trưng sisters in order to repel Han invaders from Vietnam in 43 CE. She was pregnant at the time, and was in charge of protecting the central flank. Legend says she gave birth on the front lines and carried her newborn in one arm and a sword in the other as she fought to open the ranks of the enemy.

References

43 deaths
Ancient people who committed suicide
Filicides
Han dynasty rebels
Murder–suicides in Asia
Women in 1st-century warfare
Suicides in Vietnam
Trưng sisters
Vietnamese military personnel who committed suicide
Vietnamese rebels
Women in ancient Chinese warfare
Women in war in Vietnam 
Year of birth unknown